The Trent Durham Student Association (TDSA) is a non-profit and was created to represent all students, whether part-time or full-time, that attended classes at the Durham Campus of Trent University.  The TDSA is also a member of the Ontario Undergraduate Student Alliance where the TDSA Vice President of University Affairs sits as a board member. In collaboration with OUSA the TDSA have advocated doe students by working with the provincial and local governments to provide students with services they may need.

History of the TDSA 
Trent University has been located in Oshawa since they started offering class in 1974 and the campus was originally known as Trent University of Oshawa.  Students who attended classes during this time went to the same campus as the students at University of Ontario Institute of Technology and Durham College where students of all three institutions shared the same student association which was called "YOURSA".

In 2009, Trent University decided to move the Durham Campus of the DC/UOIT campus and relocate it to the site of what once was St. Michael's Catholic school which was located at 55 Thornton Road South in Oshawa.  Once the campus was established at this new location the University formed the Trent Oshawa Student Association in 2010 to represent students attending the Durham Campus of Trent University. This association was later renamed the Trent Durham Student Association when Trent University renames the satellite school to Trent University Durham GTA  .

TDSA Available Services 
TDSA has a number of established services to help the Durham students including events, clubs, bursaries, and health benefits.  Some of the current financial aid available to students are:

 Hygiene Product Fund
 Emergency Bursary Fund
 Gender Affirming Care Grant
 Grocery Assistance Fund 

The TDSA also supports clubs that are located on the campus.  The current clubs are as follows:

 African Black Caribbean Club
 Child & Youth Studies Intersectionality Circle
 Trent DND Club
 Trent English Student Society Oshawa
 Theater Trent

See also
List of Ontario students' associations

References

External links
TDSA website

Ontario students' associations